Alan Ure was an English football manager.  He managed Gillingham for the 1937–38 season, which saw the club finish bottom of the Football League Third Division South and fail to gain re-election.  This was his only known managerial appointment, and there is no record of his having played football at a professional level.

References

Gillingham F.C. managers
English football managers
Possibly living people